The Executive of the Year Award is given annually to the National Lacrosse League executive who is chosen as having the most positive impact on his or her team.

Past winners

References

Executive
+